Điện Biên Đông is a commune-level town (thị trấn) and capital of Điện Biên Đông District of Điện Biên Province, northwestern Vietnam.

References

Populated places in Điện Biên province
District capitals in Vietnam
Townships in Vietnam